Menet is a commune in the Cantal department in south-central France.

The village is noteworthy for its twelfth century Romanesque Church of St Peter, and for its small lake.

Population

See also
Communes of the Cantal department

References

Communes of Cantal